The Quaker Oats Plant is the largest cereal mill in the world, located in downtown Cedar Rapids, Iowa, United States. It is currently the 4th-tallest building in Cedar rapids. 

Located on the north side of downtown, it is cut off from the rest of the downtown area by I-380. The west side of the site is alongside Cedar River. On the north and east sides, the site is bounded by Cedar Lake, train yards and other industrial sites. The Plant is served by the Union Pacific Railroad which connects the Plant to Grain Elevators around the state, there is also a Canadian National line that terminates at the plant, but there is no connection to CN's network.

The facility employs 740 people and produces such products as Cap'n Crunch, Life, Quaker Oats Squares, Pearl Milling Company pancake mix and syrup, Instant Quaker Oatmeal, Standard Quaker Oats and others.

History 
In 1873, three families started an oats milling operation originally called the North Star Mill. In 1888 seven of the largest American oat millers united to form the American Cereal Company. In 1901 The American Cereal changed its name to The Quaker Oats Company. 

On March 7, 1905, an explosion occurred in the mill and much of it was burnt down. At the time the Cedar Rapids Fire Department had no modern fire engines, so many other fire departments in the area sent firemen and fire equipment to help. The main risk was that the fire could spread and burn much of downtown, so the fire engines constantly sprayed water on all the buildings downtown, they kept the fire contained so well that even the neighboring lumber yards were not burnt. There were two casualties, a worker was struck in the head with a flying brick and a first responder went missing during the incident and was presumed dead. The cause of the explosion and resulting fire was said to have been caused by spontaneous combustion.

In 1947 the company installed the electric "neon" sign that is atop the main building, since it was erected it has been the largest electric sign in Cedar Rapids. On August 10, 2020 Derecho caused major damage to the old neon sign, on June 1st and 2nd of 2021, the sign was replaced by a nearly identical sign using LED's, but kept the same historic look.

On June 7th 2018, a fire was reported at the facility. Employees found that an oven on the 10th floor caused the fire.

See also
 List of tallest buildings in Iowa

References

Quaker Oats Company
Buildings and structures in Cedar Rapids, Iowa
Chicago school architecture in the United States by state
Buildings and structures completed in 1927